The 1914 Maine Black Bears football team was an American football team that represented the University of Maine during the 1914 college football season. The team compiled a 6–3 record.  David Baker was the team captain.

Passing game innovator Eddie Cochems was hired as Maine's head football coach in April 1914. He served only one season as Maine's head coach.

Schedule

References

Maine
Maine Black Bears football seasons
Maine Black Bears football